Anu Raud (born 10 May 1943, in Russia) is an Estonian textile artist and author.

In 1967, she graduated from State Art Institute.

She has been a long-time lecturer at the Estonian Academy of Arts and Viljandi Culture Academy. Since 2009, she is Professor Emeritus of the National Academy of Arts.

Since 2016, she is a member of Estonian Academy of Sciences.

Her collection of traditional handicraft is exhibited at Heimtali Museum in Viljandi County.

Awards
 1978 and 1994 Kristjan Raud Award
 1998 Order of the White Star, III class

References

Living people
1943 births
20th-century Estonian women artists
21st-century Estonian women artists
20th-century women textile artists
20th-century textile artists
21st-century women textile artists
21st-century textile artists